Constantin Cotacu (born 11 October 1937) is a Romanian bobsledder. He competed in the two-man and the four-man events at the 1964 Winter Olympics.

References

1937 births
Living people
Romanian male bobsledders
Olympic bobsledders of Romania
Bobsledders at the 1964 Winter Olympics
People from Sinaia